Shantimol Philips  is an Indian athlete. She won a Silver  medal in  4 × 400 m relay  in the 1990 Asian Games.

References

Athletes (track and field) at the 1990 Asian Games
Indian female sprinters
Asian Games silver medalists for India
Asian Games medalists in athletics (track and field)
Medalists at the 1990 Asian Games